City of Refuge may refer to:

Places
 Cities of Refuge, the six biblical places referred to by that title
 City of Refuge (Atlanta), a homeless ministry in Atlanta, Georgia
 Puuhonua o Honaunau, the Hawaiian location known as "City of Refuge"
 City of Refuge Church in Gardena, California, US, led by Noel Jones

Music
 "City of Refuge", a song from Nick Cave and the Bad Seeds' album Tender Prey
 City of Refuge (Abigail Washburn album), 2011, or the title song
 City of Refuge (John Fahey album), 1997
 City of Refuge, 2008 album by John French, onetime drummer for Captain Beefheart's Magic Band

See also 
 I'm Gonna Run to the City of Refuge, a traditional gospel song